Basavarsikoppa is a village in Dharwad district of Karnataka, India.

Demographics
As of the 2011 Census of India there were 32 households in Basavarsikoppa and a total population of 178 consisting of 98 males and 80 females. There were 27 children ages 0-6.

References

Villages in Dharwad district